The 2018 Open Città della Disfida was a professional tennis tournament played on clay courts. It was the 19th edition of the tournament which was part of the 2018 ATP Challenger Tour. It took place in Barletta, Italy between 9 and 15 April 2018.

Singles main-draw entrants

Seeds

 1 Rankings are as of 2 April 2018.

Other entrants
The following players received wildcards into the singles main draw:
  Matteo Donati
  Gian Marco Moroni
  Andrea Pellegrino

The following players received entry from the qualifying draw:
  Kimmer Coppejans
  Daniel Gimeno Traver
  Zsombor Piros
  Marco Trungelliti

The following players received entry as lucky losers:
  Maxime Chazal
  Oscar Otte
  Marko Tepavac

Champions

Singles

  Marco Trungelliti def.  Simone Bolelli 2–6, 7–6(7–4), 6–4.

Doubles

 Denys Molchanov /  Igor Zelenay def.  Ariel Behar /  Máximo González 6–1, 6–2.

References

Open Città della Disfida
2018